is a Japanese manga series written and illustrated by Minoru Mitsuba. It was serialized in Takeshobo's Monthly Kissca from July 2018 to February 2020, with its chapters collected in a single tankōbon volume. In North America, the manga was licensed for English release by Seven Seas Entertainment.

Publication
Written and illustrated by Devilish Darlings Portal Fantasy was serialized in Takeshobo's Monthly Kissca from July 6, 2018, to February 7, 2020. Takeshobo collected its chapters in a single tankōbon volume, released on May 8, 2020.

In North America, the manga was licensed for English release by Seven Seas Entertainment and released under their Ghost Ship mature imprint on July 6, 2021.

Chapter list

References

External links
 

Comedy anime and manga
Isekai anime and manga
Seinen manga
Seven Seas Entertainment titles
Takeshobo manga